The General Land Centennial Exhibition was a World's fair held in 1891 in Prague, then in the Austria-Hungarian Empire.

Many buildings were erected for this exposition, including the Průmyslový palace (Industrial Palace) and the Křižík's light fountain at Výstaviště Praha.

Summary
Taking place towards the end of the Austria-Hungarian empire this exhibition was a demonstration of what was to soon become Czechoslovakia's desire for independence. Its date marked 100 years since the first industrial exhibition held in 1791 in Prague's Clementinum when Prague was part of the Habsburg monarchy. The German population in Prague attempted to move the 1891 expo to the following year when it could not be used to mark the century. And then when it was held largely boycotted it.

Sometimes known as the Prague Jubilee Exhibition the main site for the fair is now the Prague Exhibition Grounds close to Stromovka Park. The biggest building was the Průmyslový palace designed by Bedřich Münzberger

Opening
The fair was opened on 15 May 1891 by Archduke Karl Ludwig and attended by government ministers, the governor Count Franz Thun and Prince George Lobkowicz. Emperor Franz Josef I did not attend the opening ceremony, but visited the fair later. Also the Křižík's light fountain was introduced.

Art
Paintings shown included works by Emanuel Krescenc Liška and Hopeless Love by Augustin Němejc which won a second prize.

Legacy
Many buildings from the fair still exist including the Art Nouveau Hanau Pavilion at Letná and a 60-meter tall Petřín Lookout Tower on top of the Petřín hill. The Křižík's light fountain was reconstructed recently and is still operational.

References

External links
 An image of the Hanava Pavilion
 Another image of the Hanava Pavilion

 

1891 in Austria-Hungary
19th century in Prague
1891 festivals
AH